The 2009 NCAA Division I Field Hockey Championship was the 29th women's collegiate field hockey tournament organized by the National Collegiate Athletic Association, to determine the top college field hockey team in the United States. The North Carolina Tar Heels field hockey won their sixth championship, defeating the Maryland Terrapins in the final. The semifinals and championship were hosted by Wake Forest University at Kentner Stadium in Winston-Salem, North Carolina.

Bracket

References 

2009
Field Hockey
2009 in women's field hockey
2009 in sports in North Carolina